Trupanea watti is a species of tephritid or fruit flies in the genus Trupanea of the family Tephritidae.

Distribution
New Zealand.

References

Tephritinae
Insects described in 1931
Diptera of Australasia